Carter Road may refer to:

Carter Road Promenade, Mumbai, India
Carter Road (Utah), a historic military road in Utah in the United States